Cardullo is a surname. Notable people with the surname include:

Mario Cardullo (born 1957), American inventor
Paola Cardullo (born 1982), Italian volleyball player
Stephen Cardullo (born 1987), American baseball player

See also
Cardillo